Collins Place is a large mixed-use complex in the CBD of Melbourne, Victoria, Australia. Designed in about 1970 by I.M.Pei and Partners, and finally completed in 1981, it was Melbourne's first and Australia's largest mixed use project, including basement car-parking, a shopping plaza with professional suites, cinemas and a nightclub in the lower levels, and offices and a high-rise hotel in a pair of towers (35 and 55 Collins Street) above.

History
The development of the project began with the purchase of a number of old buildings in the 'Paris End' of Collins Street by the ANZ Bank in the late 1960s. They acted on the advice of the Montreal-based American Vincent Ponte to join with adjacent land owners to develop an ambitious multi-use complex, similar to those developed in North America in the 1960s. The Bank joined with the AMP Society and Mainline Corporation to amalgamate a site of nearly a whole city block, and commissioned a design from  the New York firm of Architects, I. M. Pei and Partners and the Melbourne firm of Bates, Smart and McCutcheon as associate architects in about 1970.

The construction of Collins Place took far longer than anticipated due to the credit squeeze of the 1970s, the collapse of Mainline, and strike action by construction unions. It opened in two stages, the first being the ANZ Bank's office tower in 1978. The hotel, named The Wentworth, and the shopping plaza, dubbed 'the Great Space', opened on 18 May 1981, to great fanfare and a 7-page advertising spread in The Age. The  final cost was A$270 million.

The hotel's restaurants at the 35th floor were for many years admired for their views, which Melburnians could enjoy for free by a visit to the toilets on that floor. The cinemas finally opened in 1987 with two screens, known as The Kino, and continue to operate now with seven screens.

The shopping plaza and hotel have been refurbished a number of times; while there have been no major structural alterations the 1970s decor of earth tones has been altered in favour of contemporary colours and materials. More shop fronts have been added or opened up facing the surrounding streets, reducing the enclosed nature of the complex, which was much criticised.

Architecture
The design was based around a pair of towers at 45 degree angles to the Hoddle Grid, with the triangular spaces between forming an open plaza to the street and a shopping court behind the towers. All open spaces are covered by a space frame, with transparent plastic roofing. The hotel occupies the top 15 floors of the 35 Collins Street tower, expressed by smaller exterior windows, and which features a dramatic interior atrium the whole 15 levels.  The whole complex is clad in tan-coloured precast masonry panels.

Main tenants
35 Collins Street
 3-16, no longer Telstra
 17-21, NTT Australia Pty Ltd [Building Signage]
 23,24, Victorian Auditor - General's Of
 24, Agora Asset Management
 25, Amdocs
 26, ITS Global
 26, Jetro
 17 & 29, AMP Capital Investors
 30, VCSO - Victory Corporate Serviced Offices
 35-50, Sofitel Hotel [Building Signage]

55 Collins Street
 All floors are completely leased to ANZ
 There a number of sub-tenants in the building including Drake International, Clark and CG Associates and GTA Consultants.
Richie Nasr

See also
Collins Place, now Exhibition Street
List of tallest buildings in Melbourne

References

External links
 http://skyscraperpage.com/diagrams/?cityID=18

Skyscrapers in Melbourne
Office buildings in Melbourne
Skyscraper office buildings in Australia
Skyscraper hotels in Australia
Shopping centres in Victoria (Australia)
Commercial buildings completed in 1981
1981 establishments in Australia
Collins Street, Melbourne
Buildings and structures in Melbourne City Centre